Regal Cinemas (also Regal Entertainment Group) is an American movie theater chain headquartered in Knoxville, Tennessee. A division of Cineworld, Regal operates the second-largest theater circuit in the United States, with 6,853 screens in 511 theaters as of December 31, 2021. The three main theatre brands operated by Regal Entertainment Group are Regal Cinemas, Edwards Theatres, and United Artists Theatres.

These chains retain their exterior signage, but most indoor branding (popcorn bags, policy trailers) uses the Regal Entertainment Group name and logo. Most new cinema construction uses the Regal Cinemas name. Regal has acquired several smaller chains since this merger; these, however, have been rebranded as Regal Cinemas.

On December 5, 2017, it was announced that the British theater chain Cineworld would acquire Regal for $3.6 billion, making it the second largest global cinema exhibitor behind AMC. On September 7, 2022, Cineworld filed for Chapter 11 bankruptcy.

History

1989–2002: Three separate chains

Regal Cinemas was established in 1989 in Knoxville, Tennessee, with Mike Campbell as CEO. Its first location was the Searstown Cinema in Titusville, Florida. Regal began to grow at a rapid pace, opening larger cinemas in suburban areas. Many of these contained a "premium" café (later called Cafe Del Moro) and a more upscale look than typical theaters of the time.

Regal Cinemas embarked on a large-scale expansion throughout the decade, acquiring smaller chains as well as building new, more modern multiplexes. Its largest acquisition during this original period was the 1998 combination of it and Act III Theatres, although it had acquired some smaller chains as well in the mid-1990s, including the original Cobb Theatres, RC Theatres, and Cleveland-based National Theatre Corp.

By 2001, Regal was overextended, and went into Chapter 11 bankruptcy. It became the namesake for the theater chain in which it would be merged into with the Edwards and United Artists chains.

The chain's famous "Regal Roller Coaster" policy trailer, which was shown before every movie shown from the early 1990s to the fall of 2004, was revived in 2010 and the current version was made in 2015, which was animated by The Tombras Group.

United Artists Theatres
United Artists Theatres (established in 1924) has its roots in the movie studio of the same name founded by Douglas Fairbanks, Mary Pickford, Charlie Chaplin, and D. W. Griffith, but legally has always been separate from it. Joseph Schenck was brought in to become UA's president in 1924; as part of the deal, Schenck entered into a partnership with Chaplin and Pickford to buy and construct theatres using UA's name. Over time, the chain became separate from the studio and by the 1970s was part of a larger company, United Artists Communications.

United Artists Theatres was purchased in the late 1940s by the Naify Brothers, who owned theatres in the San Francisco Bay Area. Their company up to this time was called Golden State Theatres. About this time they also acquired the San Francisco Theatres owned by Samuel H Levin. These theatres were the Balboa, Alexandria, Coliseum, Vogue, Metro, the Harding, and Coronet, which was opened in 1949. In 1988 UA bought the Philadelphia-based Sameric chain of about 30 locations in PA, NJ, and DE. The UA Theatres main office was in San Francisco until 1988 when it was sold to TCI. Thereafter, it was relocated to Englewood, CO.

UA was an early pioneer in cable television, and aggressively bought smaller regional systems. By the end of the 1980s, John Malone's Tele-Communications, Inc. was majority owner; on June 8, 1991, it purchased the remainder of the company. Then on February 19, 1992, TCI sold the theatre chain in a leveraged buyout led by Merrill Lynch Capital Partners Inc and UA management.

Edwards Theatres

Edwards Theatres was a family-owned chain in California, started in 1930 by William James Edwards Jr. It became one of California's best-known and most popular theater chains, and by Edwards' death in 1997, operated about 90 locations with 560 screens. Edwards Theatres had its headquarters in Newport Beach, California. His son, W. James Edwards III, became president and announced an ambitious expansion plan that would nearly double the company's screen count. The expansion plan gave Edwards a crushing debt load, and in 2000 it filed for bankruptcy.

2002–2017: Anschutz consolidation
 When all three chains went into bankruptcy, investor Philip Anschutz bought substantial investments in all three companies, becoming majority owner. In 2002, Anschutz consolidated his three theatre holdings under a new parent company, Regal Entertainment Group. Regal's Mike Campbell and UA's Kurt Hall were named co-CEOs, with Campbell overseeing the theatre operations from Regal Cinemas' headquarters in Knoxville, and Kurt Hall heading up a new subsidiary, Regal CineMedia, from the UA offices in Centennial, Colorado. The Edwards corporate offices were closed.

Regal and United Artists had attempted to merge before in 1998, using a similar method. Investment firms Kohlberg Kravis Roberts and Hicks, Muse, Tate & Furst announced plans to acquire Regal, then merge it with UA (which would be bought by Hicks, Muse) and Act III (controlled by KKR), with the new company using the Regal Cinemas name. UA eventually dropped out of the merger, but the merger between Regal and Act III went through.

As Regal consolidated the three chains, CineMedia began work on a new digital distribution system to provide a new "preshow," replacing the slides and film advertisements with digital content. NBC and Turner Broadcasting were among the first to sign on to provide content for the venture, and the preshow, dubbed "The 2wenty," debuted in February 2003; this pre-film preshow is now known as "Regal FirstLook." The new distribution system was also meant to be used for special events such as concerts. Regal CineMedia merged with AMC Theatres' National Cinema Network in 2005 to form National CineMedia. In effect, this was a takeover of NCN by Regal CineMedia, as Kurt Hall stayed on as CEO and AMC adopted Regal's preshow. Regal owned 50% of the new company before it went public.

Since the 2002 formation of REG, it has acquired several smaller chains. It took over the US assets of Hoyts Cinemas in March 2003 and announced the acquisition of San Ramon, California–based Signature Theatres in April 2004. Unlike the merger with UA and Edwards, Regal has rebranded all of these theatres as Regal Cinemas. In April 2005, Eastern Federal, which was a theatre company in the Southeastern United States, was acquired by Regal. In February 2013, Regal agreed to purchase Hollywood Theaters, a nationwide chain of 46 theaters that operated from Portland, Oregon. The sale was closed on April 1, 2013. In May 2017 Regal purchased the $200 million company Warren Theaters based in Wichita, Kansas. The sale included all Warren Theater locations in Wichita KS as well as those in Moore and Broken Arrow OK. The theaters will continue operation under the Warren name.

In 2007, REG opened its first all-digital projection theatre in Henderson, Nevada (a suburb of Las Vegas), the Fiesta Henderson Stadium 12. Regal sold Fandango to leading cable company Comcast Corporation in 2007.

Regal Entertainment Group completed its acquisition of Consolidated Theatres on May 1, 2008. In the transaction, Regal acquired Consolidated's 28 theaters and 400 screens for $210 million. Consolidated's concentrations of theatres in the Mid-Atlantic states of Maryland, Virginia, Tennessee, Georgia and North and South Carolina overlapped in some places with Regal's. As of a condition of approval of the merger, the United States Department of Justice required that Regal divest itself of several theaters in areas where it would have a monopoly. Regal agreed to sell off four theaters in the Asheville, Charlotte and Raleigh, North Carolina markets, but a large number of theaters still remains in all three markets.

On May 17, 2009, Regal signed a deal with Sony Corporation to equip all of its theaters with Sony 4K digital projection over the next three to five years.

In April 2010, Regal launched Regal Premium Experience (RPX), an upgraded theater format. Each RPX theater features a 60-foot screen, dual 30,000 lumen digital projectors, a 7.1 sound system, a Dolby Atmos sound system or an Auro 11.1 sound system with 273 loudspeaker components including eight 21 inch subwoofers. There are reclining leather seats with headrests. Both digital 2D and RealD 3D films can be screened. As of January 2016, there are 87 operating RPX locations.

In June 2011, after posting a loss for the first quarter, Regal began downsizing its theater employees by removing managers from projection and replacing them with lower paid floor staff. This move allowed Regal to lay off part-time managers across the country and forcibly demote many full-time managers to part-time. As theaters converted to all digital automated screens, Regal also removed projectionists altogether. This focus on "cost control" helped the company post better than expected profits for the 3rd quarter of that year.

In March 2014, AEG and Regal announced an agreement to add 4DX—a 4D film format—to its location at L.A. Live. As of 2018, it operated six 4DX screens nationwide, with plans to expand to at least 79.

In December 2015, Regal took over managing operations of Cinebarre, a former joint venture between Regal Entertainment Group and Terrell Braly. There are eight Cinebarre locations in the Regal Entertainment Group circuit. These locations feature a full bar as well a full made-from-scratch restaurant menu which is delivered right to the customer's seat.

In January 2016, Regal was issued a temporary injunction by a district court in the state of Texas following complaints by the Houston-based cinema chain iPic Entertainment, which found that Regal had colluded with 20th Century Fox, Sony, and Universal by threatening boycotts of their releases if they did not refuse clearance of their films to smaller cinema chain locations (such as iPic).

In 2017, Regal purchased Wichita, Kansas–based Warren Theatres.

2018–present: Acquisition by Cineworld
In November 2017, Regal began merger talks with the UK theater chain Cineworld. On December 5, it was officially announced that Cineworld would buy Regal for $3.6 billion, forming the world's second-largest cinema group.

Regal adopted a new logo in October 2018, featuring an emblem resembling a camera aperture and crown. In recognition of the company's Knoxville heritage, Regal adopted orange as a corporate color in reference to the Tennessee Volunteers.

In July 2019, Regal announced a new movie ticket subscription service known as Regal Unlimited. This service allows users to see an unlimited number of movies and receive a 10% discount on concessions, although there is an additional surcharge for premium movie formats. The service is modeled upon a similar program employed by Cineworld.

On January 7, 2020, in alignment with existing agreements with Cineworld, it was announced that PepsiCo would replace The Coca-Cola Company as the exclusive supplier of non-alcoholic beverages to all Regal cinemas, notably breaking a monopoly held by Coke among the top three cinema chains in the United States. Pepsi also became the "exclusive sponsor" of Regal's 4DX screens.

COVID-19 pandemic 

On March 16, 2020, Regal Cinemas closed all 543 of its theaters in the United States indefinitely due to the COVID-19 pandemic, becoming the first theater chain in the United States to close all its theater locations as a result of the pandemic.
Regal Cinemas started reopening most of its theaters on August 21, 2020, with a few delayed until August 28 and others closed indefinitely due to local restrictions or having already been planned to close prior to the pandemic.

On October 5, 2020, Cineworld announced it would close most Regal, and all Cineworld, and Picturehouse Cinemas locations in the US, UK, and Ireland indefinitely, beginning October 8. CEO Mooky Greidinger specifically cited that the continued reluctance of New York to allow cinemas to open was the main factor, as well as the lack of tentpole Hollywood films due to the high cost of operating a cinema without new releases (describing the delay of the James Bond film No Time to Die from November to April 2021 as being the "last straw"). Mooky argued that the studios were holding off on new releases until New York cinemas reopen (accusing Governor Andrew Cuomo of being inflexible, despite having allowed other forms of indoor businesses to resume operations), and that the company only planned to reopen its cinemas once it is confident there is a "clear" and "solid" lineup of new releases.

The closures initially excluded seven recently opened locations in California, and 11 New York state locations (after it began to allow cinemas outside of New York City to reopen on October 23 at 25% capacity if specific health metrics are met). However, on November 9, Regal announced that these locations would close until further notice effective November 12.

On March 23, 2021, Cineworld announced that in light of theaters in New York City and Los Angeles being given the go-ahead to reopen theaters earlier in the month, they would begin reopening select Regal locations on April 2, in time for the release of Godzilla vs. Kong, with the company aiming to have most Regal locations reopened by April 16, in time for the release of Mortal Kombat, which was pushed back a week to April 23. The wide reopening was pushed back to May 7, with all but 13 open by May 28. Cineworld reached agreements with Disney, Universal, and Warner Bros. to commit to theatrical windows.

On June 19, 2021, Regal Cinemas acquired the lease of the former Arclight Cinemas at the Sherman Oaks Galleria in Los Angeles, with plans for a $10 million remodel that would include premium large format, 4DX, and ScreenX screens.

Cineworld bankruptcy

In August 2022, the Wall Street Journal reported that Cineworld would file for bankruptcy after struggling to rebuild attendance and incurring debts of more than $4.8 billion amid the pandemic. Cineworld confirmed that Regal Cinemas would remain in operation while Cineworld would evaluate their financial strategies. On September 7, 2022, Cineworld announced that it had filed for Chapter 11 bankruptcy. Cineworld plans to emerge from Chapter 11 in the first quarter of 2023, and planned to pursue "a real estate optimisation strategy", including the closure or sale of theaters and other discussions with landlords on its cinema lease terms with Regal. 

On September 28, 2022, The Wall Street Journal reported that Canadian exhibitor Cineplex was exploring the possibility of merging with Regal; Cineworld had attempted to acquire Cineplex in 2020, but was forced to pay US$1 billion in damages for breach of contract after backing out of the deal. Cineworld was denied an appeal by the Ontario Superior Court of Justice, which had ruled in favor of Cineplex in the associated legal dispute.

Premium theaters
 RealD 3D: A stereoscopic partner of Regal that shows movies in 3D.
 Regal Premium Experience (RPX): Regal's premium large format.
 IMAX: Regal operates at least 94 IMAX locations in the United States.
 4DX: Created by CGV's CJ 4DPLEX, 4DX utilizes motion-enhanced seats that sync with the film's actions, accompanied by environmental special effects such as wind, strobe lights, water, air blasts, leg ticklers, vibrations, rainstorm, smoke, and scent. It opened its first theater at the L.A. Live theater in 2014 and has 32 theaters as of May 2021.
 ScreenX: A movie theater that presents films with two additional screens on walls for a 270-degree view. Created by CJ CGV and has 34 theaters as of May 2021.

See also

 AMC Theatres
 Cinemark Theatres

References

External links

 

 
1989 establishments in Tennessee
2018 mergers and acquisitions
American companies established in 1989
American subsidiaries of foreign companies
Companies based in Knoxville, Tennessee
Companies formerly listed on the New York Stock Exchange
Companies that filed for Chapter 11 bankruptcy in 2001
Companies that filed for Chapter 11 bankruptcy in 2022
Entertainment companies established in 1989
Movie theatre chains in the United States